Carolina Ödman-Govender ( – 15 November 2022) was a Swiss physicist and academic who was Professor of Astrophysics at South Africa's University of the Western Cape. She was awarded the 2018 International Astronomical Union Special Executive Committee Award for Astronomy Outreach, Development and Education.

Early life and education 
Ödman grew up in Switzerland; her parents were Swedish. Inspired by her high school physics teacher, she pursued a career in the sciences. She studied physics at the École Polytechnique Fédérale de Lausanne and graduated in 2000. She earned her PhD at the University of Cambridge, where she was a member of Trinity Hall. She has also consulted for UNESCO, working on the impact of science and technology in society. She became interested in the philosophical aspects of science; for example, why people are interested in astronomy.

Research and career 

From 2004 to 2005 she was a Marie Curie Skłodowska postdoctoral scholar at Universita degli studi di Roma "La Sapienza". She worked in cosmology on several subjects as dark energy, analysis of cosmic microwave background data, and inflation. In 2005 Ödman joined Leiden University as an international project manager, where she worked with George Miley. Amongst other achievements, this involved setting up the Astronomy for Africa taskforce and leading Universe Awareness (UNAWE). Universe Awareness is an outreach programme that inspires children about astronomy, reaching over 400,000 children in over 60 countries. She joined the Square Kilometre Array project at the South African Astronomical Observatory in 2010. Ödman was made Director of Academic Development at the African Institute for Mathematical Sciences in 2011. In 2012 she received the Science Prize for Online Resources in Education (SPORE) award for her work on Universe Awareness. She was part of the team that created GalileoMobile project.

In 2018 Ödman was made Associate Director for Development and Outreach of the Inter-University Institute for Data Intensive Astronomy (IDIA) and an Associate Professor at the University of the Western Cape.

In 2021, she was awarded the 2020/2021 National Science and Technology Forum (NSTF)'s Communication Award, "for reshaping how science is communicated to the general public and in particular research into building a scientific vocabulary in African languages".

Personal life and death 
Ödman was married to Kevin Govender in South Africa. They had two sons.

In early 2018, Ödman was diagnosed with pancreatic adenocarcinoma. She died in Cape Town on 15 November 2022, at the age of 48.

Publications

References 

1970s births
2022 deaths
Date of birth unknown
Deaths from cancer in South Africa
Deaths from pancreatic cancer
École Polytechnique Fédérale de Lausanne alumni
Leiden University alumni
Science communication award winners
Science communicators
Swiss people of Swedish descent
Swiss women academics
Swiss women physicists
Swiss women scientists
Academic staff of the University of the Western Cape